The Republic of Mulhouse (in German: Stadtrepublik Mülhausen) was a protestant associate of the Old Swiss Confederation.

Mulhouse had been a free city of the Empire since 1275. It became a Republic in 1347 with the election of its first burgomaster, Hans von Dornach. It gained complete autonomy in 1395, thus arousing the animosity of the surrounding nobility. This led the city to gradually break off its relations with the rest of Alsace and join the Swiss confederates following the Six-Pence war, from which it emerged victorious.

From 1354 to 1515, Mulhouse was part of the Décapole, an association of ten Free Imperial Cities in Alsace. The city formally broke away from the Empire and joined the Swiss Confederation as an associate in 1515 and was therefore not annexed by France in the Peace of Westphalia in 1648 like the rest of the Sundgau. 

An enclave in Alsace, it was a free and independent Calvinist republic, known as Stadtrepublik Mülhausen, associated with the Swiss Confederation until, after a vote by its citizens on 4 January 1798, it became a part of France in the Treaty of Mulhouse signed on 28 January 1798, during the Directory period of the French Revolution and following the French declaration of war on Switzerland.

See also 
Old Swiss Confederacy

References 

Mulhouse
History of Switzerland